The Fredvang Bridges are two cantilever bridges that connect the fishing village of Fredvang on the island of Moskenesøya with the neighboring island of Flakstadøya.  The bridges are located in Flakstad Municipality in Nordland county, Norway.

The south bridge is called Kubholmleia Bridge and the north bridge is Røssøystraumen Bridge.

The bridges were opened in 1988. They are among many bridges that connect the islands of the Lofoten archipelago to each other.  The only other bridge connecting these two islands is the Kåkern Bridge.

See also
List of bridges in Norway
List of bridges in Norway by length
List of bridges
List of bridges by length

Photos
Picture 1 
Picture 2 
Picture 3

References

Flakstad
Road bridges in Nordland
Bridges completed in 1988
1988 establishments in Norway
Roads within the Arctic Circle